André Lévy may refer to:
 André Lévy (sinologist) (1925–2017), French sinologist
 
 André Robert Lévy (1893–1973), World War I flying ace